Viros or Vyros may refer to:
 Vyros Gorge, a gorge in the Peloponnese, Greece
 Viros, Greece, a village in the municipal unit Achilleio, Corfu, Greece

VIROS may refer to :
 VIRtual memory Operating System, the TOPS-20 first in-house code name